Darreh Shur (also Romanized as Darreh Shūr and Darreh-ye Shūr; also known as Darrashar and Darreh Shar) is a village in Golashkerd Rural District, in the Central District of Faryab County, Kerman Province, Iran. At the 2006 census, its population was 427, in 108 families.

References 

Populated places in Faryab County